Christine Norden (born Mary Lydia Thornton; 28 December 1924 – 21 September 1988) was a British actress.

Early life
Norden was born in Mowbray Terrace, Sunderland. She was the daughter of a bus driver. Her childhood home was in Chester Road, Sunderland, and she was educated at Chester Road Primary School and Havelock School.

Career
Norden gained experience singing and dancing while performing in wartime ENSA concerts and variety shows as a teenager. One claim to fame was that she was the first entertainer to land on Normandy beaches after D-Day. At the age of 20 she was "discovered" in a cinema queue and given a screen test by Sir Alexander Korda. Her screen debut was as a nightclub singer in the 1947 film Night Beat. In an interview with the Sunderland Echo on 3 June 1952, she said: "Please don't refer to me as the girl who was discovered in a cinema queue. I'm so tired of that tag. You see, nobody believes it, and it aggravates me so much because it happens to be true." Her best-known appearances were in An Ideal Husband, Mine Own Executioner and the 1949 film Saints and Sinners. She won a British National Film Award in 1949 for the latter performance.

After appearing in ten films within five years, Norden left Britain for America in 1952, where she settled in New York and married her third husband, US Air Force sergeant Mitchell Dodge. She went on to become an American citizen in 1960, starring on Broadway in the musical Tenderloin at around the same time. She also caused a sensation in 1967, when she became the first actress to appear topless on Broadway, in the comedy Scuba Duba.

Norden returned to London in the 1970s to work on stage, screen, and television, but retained an apartment in New York and held several exhibitions of her paintings in Manhattan.

Family
Norden married five times. Her first husband was bandleader Norman Cole, by whom she had a son, Michael. Her other husbands included British film director Jack Clayton and musician Herbert Hecht. Her 1977 biography, The Champagne Days Are Over, also detailed other romantic links. Actress June Mitchell (1933–2009) was Norden's sister.

Death
She died in Middlesex, aged 63, from pneumonia following heart bypass surgery. She was survived by her son, Michael Cole, and her widower, George Heselden, a retired mathematician who used to work for the Ministry of Defence.  In 1988, following her death, part of the planet Venus was named after her as a tribute to her reputation as Britain's first postwar sex symbol.

Filmography

References

External links

1924 births
1988 deaths
English film actresses
English stage actresses
Deaths from pneumonia in England
Actresses from London
People from Sunderland
Actresses from Tyne and Wear
20th-century English actresses